"We Are Rockstars" is the third single by Does It Offend You, Yeah? taken from the band's debut album You Have No Idea What You're Getting Yourself Into. It was the first song made entirely from synthesizers and music software from the band when it was a two-piece duo with James Rushent and Dan Coop. In 2007, the then-six piece band recorded parts for the song for their first album.

In 2009, electro house producers Cold Blank released a bootleg remix of We Are Rockstars.

Track listing
 "We Are Rockstars" (radio edit) - 2:58

Charts

Appearances in media
Featured in the trailer for the 2009 film Fast & Furious.
Featured in the soundtrack in the VW GTI Project online game.
The theme song for the Horne & Corden show.
Used in the game Saints Row 2.
Used in the game FIFA Street 3.
Used in the game MotorStorm: Arctic Edge.

Personnel
 James Rushent – vocals, all instruments, production
 Dan Coop – all instruments, production

2008 singles
2008 songs
Virgin Records singles